The Zimbabwean cricket team toured New Zealand from 26 January to 14 February 2012. The tour consisted of one Test, three One Day Internationals (ODIs) and two Twenty20 (T20) matches.

New Zealand won the tour's sole Test in Napier by an innings and 301 runs, setting new records for New Zealand's largest Test victory and Zimbabwe's biggest Test defeat. New Zealand won the ODI series 3–0, and the T20I series 2–0.

The second ODI was the first international match played in Whangarei, held at Cobham Oval.

Background

For Zimbabwe, captained by Brendan Taylor the one-off Test was their first overseas since returning from their five-year absence from Test cricket. New Zealand, led by Ross Taylor, entered the Test as the eighth-ranked Test team by the International Cricket Council. Their most recent Test series had been a 1–1 draw in Australia.

Squads

Tour Matches

Three-day: New Zealand XI v Zimbabweans

Test series

Only Test

Day 1
Zimbabwe won the toss and put New Zealand into bat. Ross Taylor made an unbeaten sixth Test hundred just before stumps on day one. New Zealand collected 331 runs for the loss of five wickets, with half-centuries to Brendon McCullum (83) and Martin Guptill (51) helping set up a strong total. Playing their first away Test since the Centurion in March 2005, Zimbabwe's seamers failed to exploit favourable early conditions. Ross Taylor made a century and New Zealand was 5/331 at stumps.

Day 2
Only 15.2 overs were bowled on the second day of the Test at McLean Park before light, but persistent, rain set in to make further play impossible. Ross Taylor retired hurt on 122*, and BJ Watling made unbeaten fifty, his second in Test cricket, as New Zealand was 5/392 at stumps.

Day 3
New Zealand added another 103 runs in the first hour of play. After Watling (102*) made his first career century, as New Zealand declared at drinks for 7dec/495.

The New Zealand bowlers decimated the Zimbabwean batting line-up in its first innings. Zimbabwe was reduced to 5/20 at lunch, and dismissed for 51 in the 29th over, with Malcolm Waller (23) the only Zimbabwean to reach double figures. The New Zealand bowlers shared the wickets, with all four fast bowlers (Martin, Southee, Bracewell and Boult) claiming two wickets each. Leading by 444 runs, New Zealand enforced the follow-on.

The second innings started no better, as Zimbabwe was reduced to 5/12 shortly after tea, with Chris Martin taking three early wickets. Zimbabwe finally managed to compile some partnerships in the lower order, with Regis Chakabva (63) and Graeme Cremer (26) adding 63 for the seventh wicket. New Zealand ultimately dismissed Zimbabwe again inside extended play at the end of the day, for a score of 143. Chris Martin (6/26) and Doug Bracewell (3/26) were the leading bowlers in the second innings, and Martin was named man of the match, with match figures of 8/31.

Records
Zimbabwe's first innings total of 51 set a new record for Zimbabwe's lowest completed innings total, breaking the previous mark of 54 set against South Africa in Cape Town in 2005, and was the lowest innings total ever conceded by New Zealand, breaking the previous mark of 59 which was also set against Zimbabwe in 2005 in Harare. The margin of an innings and 301 runs set a new record for the largest win in New Zealand's history, and the heaviest defeat in Zimbabwe's history,; in both cases, the previous record was an innings and 294 runs, set in that same 2005 match in Harare. It was only the third occasion of a team being twice bowled out inside a single day of a Test match, and the second time New Zealand had done it to Zimbabwe, the feat being previously achieved in the 2005 Harare Test.

ODI series

1st ODI

2nd ODI

3rd ODI

Twenty20 series

1st T20I

T20I debut Colin de Grandhomme (NZ)

2nd T20I

References

2011–12 New Zealand cricket season
New Zealand
International cricket competitions in 2011–12
2011-12